Charles John "Chick" Fulmer (February 13, 1851 – February 15, 1940) was a Major League Baseball player who played shortstop from  to . He played for the Rockford Forest Citys, New York Mutuals, Philadelphia White Stockings, Louisville Grays, Buffalo Bisons, Cincinnati Red Stockings, and St. Louis Browns. His brother, Washington Fulmer, also played a single game at the major league level.

Early life
Fulmer was born in Philadelphia, and he came from a family of soldiers. His father Michael was a major in the Union Army before becoming a butcher in Philadelphia. Fulmer's grandfather John fought in the American Revolution, and his great-grandfather Michael was involved in the French and Indian War. Fulmer tried to serve in the Civil War himself by joining the Southwark Guards, but he was 14 years old and he was sent home before he saw any battle.

Career
Fulmer made his major league debut for the Rockford Forest Citys in 1871, the first year that games were played in the National Association of Professional Base Ball Players. He played for the league's New York Mutuals in 1872 before moving on to a three-year stint with the Philadelphia White Stockings. He claimed that he executed the first major league unassisted triple play in 1873, but MLB lists the first one as being earned by another player in 1909. The league folded after the 1875 season.

In 1876, Fulmer received his only opportunity to manage at the major league level; he was a player-manager for the Louisville Grays in the first year of the National League's existence. The team finished 30–36. He played in the minor leagues for a couple of seasons before his Buffalo Bisons were admitted to the National League in 1879. He stayed with Buffalo in 1880, but he struggled to hit and he did not play much.

Before the 1881 season, there was talk that Fulmer would be signed by the Detroit Wolverines, but manager Frank Bancroft ultimately signed another player to fill his infield needs. Fulmer decided to sit out of baseball for a year, becoming the manager of a traveling theater troupe that staged productions of Uncle Tom's Cabin. He returned to baseball for three years in the American Association, playing with teams in Cincinnati and St. Louis. His last professional playing appearances were in 1885 with an independent team in Portland, Maine.

Later life
Fulmer came back to Philadelphia after his baseball career was over and he stayed there for the rest of his life. He worked as a magistrate, despite not having a college education or legal training. Later, he was a doorman for the Curtis Publishing Company in the Center City district.

Fulmer suffered a stroke in the late 1930s and he died in 1940. He was interred at Fernwood Cemetery in Fernwood, Pennsylvania. He was survived by his wife, Annie; they had married 65 years earlier. Fulmer's brother, Washington Fulmer, who played in one game for the hapless 1875 Brooklyn Atlantics, preceded him in death by more than 30 years.

References

External links

Major League Baseball infielders
Philadelphia Keystones (NABBP) players
Cleveland Forest Citys (NABBP) players
Rockford Forest Citys players
New York Mutuals players
Philadelphia White Stockings players
Louisville Grays players
Buffalo Bisons (NL) players
Cincinnati Red Stockings (AA) players
St. Louis Browns (AA) players
Baseball players from Philadelphia
19th-century baseball players
1851 births
1940 deaths
Pittsburgh Allegheny players
Philadelphia Athletic players
Buffalo (minor league baseball) players
Albany (minor league baseball) players
Philadelphia Athletics (minor league) players
Portland (minor league baseball) players
Burials at Fernwood Cemetery (Lansdowne, Pennsylvania)
American magistrates
Union Army soldiers